The Lovely Lola (Spanish:La bella Lola) is a 1962 historical musical film directed by Alfonso Balcázar and starring Sara Montiel, Antonio Cifariello and Frank Villard. It was made as a co-production between France, Italy and Spain. It is based on the 1848 novel The Lady of the Camellias by Alexandre Dumas.

Cast
 Sara Montiel as Lola  
 Antonio Cifariello as Javier   
 Frank Villard as Gabriel 
 Luisa Mattioli as Ana  
 Germán Cobos as Federico 
 Laura Nucci as Madre de Javier  
 José María Caffarel as Empresario  
 Gustavo Re as Comisario 
 Roberto Martín as Teniente  
 Josep Maria Angelat
 Fernando Ulloa as Doctor 
 Antonio de Armenteras
 Jesús Puche
 Vicente Vega 
 Luis Ciges as Abogado

References

Bibliography 
 Phil Powrie. Carmen on Film: A Cultural History. Indiana University Press, 2007.

External links 
 

1960s historical musical films
French historical musical films
Italian historical musical films
Spanish historical musical films
1962 films
1960s Spanish-language films
Films based on Camille
Films directed by Alfonso Balcázar
Films set in the 19th century
Films scored by Gregorio García Segura
1960s Spanish films
1960s Italian films
1960s French films